Rassvet is a rural locality (a village) in Rassvetovsky Selsoviet, Belebeyevsky District, Bashkortostan, Russia. The population was 277 as of 2010. There are 11 streets.

Geography 
Rassvet is located 15 km southwest of Belebey (the district's administrative centre) by road. Rodniki is the nearest rural locality.

References 

Rural localities in Belebeyevsky District